Papilio elwesi is a butterfly of the family Papilionidae. The species is endemic to China and Vietnam.

Papilio elwesi (along with P. maraho) differs from all other Papilio species in the tail of the hindwing being so dilated that two veins are necessary to support it. Together these two species form the subgenus Agehana.

The larvae feed on Lauraceae species.

Etymology
It is named for British botanist, entomologist, author, lepidopterist, collector and traveller, Henry John Elwes.

elwesi
Butterflies of Indochina
Butterflies described in 1889